Thomas Nixon (born September 27, 1961) is an author and educator. His writings include Complete Guide to Online High Schools (Degree Press, 2012), Bears' Guide to Earning Degrees by Distance Learning (Ten Speed Press, 2006), Bears' Guide to Earning High School Diplomas Nontraditionally (2003), and Bears' Guide to the Best Education Degrees by Distance Learning (2001). He has written extensively on distance learning, online high schools, and financial aid for print and online publications. Nixon's latest area of interest is online high schools and school libraries. He is married to the former Elizabeth Heisinger and is the father of three children. In addition to a son, he has two daughters who were adopted from Addis Ababa, Ethiopia.

He is a graduate of California State University, Fresno with a bachelor's and a master's degrees in linguistics. He manages Online Learning and Library Services for Fresno Unified School District. He also teaches in the Graduate School at Fresno Pacific University and is a consultant for online learning programs.

Bibliography
 "Compete Guide to Online High Schools" (2nd ed., 2012, Degree Press)
 "Complete Guide to Online High Schools" (2007, Degree Press)
 "Bears' Guide to Earning Degrees by Distance Learning" (with M. Bear) (2006, Ten Speed Press)
 "Bears' Guide to Earning High School Diplomas Nontraditionally" (2003, Ten Speed Press)
 "Bears' Guide to the Best Education Degrees by Distance Learning" (with John Bear, Mariah Bear, Tom Head) (2001, Ten Speed Press)

External links
 Thomas Nixon's website
 Publisher website
 Public Library Ebook Partnerships Boost K-12 Reading by Matt Enis, Library Journal, February 20, 2020
 Students need supervision to make online learning work by Susan Frey, EdSource, September 19, 2011
 Skipping Out on Public Schools by Leah Fabel, Faces of Faith in America: Medill Belief & Public Life (Carnegie and Knight Foundations), August 25, 2007

American non-fiction writers
California State University, Fresno alumni
1961 births
Living people